Feţele Albe was a fort in the Roman province of Dacia.

See also
List of castra

References

External links
Roman castra from Romania - Google Maps / Earth 

Roman Dacia
Buildings and structures in Hunedoara County
Roman legionary fortresses in Romania
Ancient history of Transylvania